Beshankovichy District is a district (raion) in the Vitebsk Region, Belarus.

Notable residents 

 Ivan Khrutsky (1810, Vula village–1885), Belarusian artist
 Grigori Sandler (1912, Ostrovno village–1994), Soviet choral conductor
 Lew Sapieha (1557, Astroŭna estate (now village) – 1633), a nobleman and statesman of the Polish–Lithuanian Commonwealth and governor of Slonim, Brest and Mahiliow

References

 
Districts of Vitebsk Region